The 2011 Idol Star Athletics – Swimming Championships (Hangul: 아이돌 스타 육상-수영 선수권 대회) was held at Jamsil Arena in Seoul, South Korea on January 23, 2011   and was broadcast on MBC from February 5 to 6, 2011. At the championships a total number of 5 events in athletics and 2 events in swimming were contested: 4 by men and 3 by women. There were a total number of 140 participating K-pop singers and celebrities, divided into 17 teams.

Men

Athletics

Swimming

Women

Athletics

Swimming
Special appearance and swimming performance by Jeong Da-rae.

Ratings

References

External links
 2011 Idol Star Athletics-Swimming Championships official MBC website 

MBC TV original programming
South Korean variety television shows
South Korean game shows
2011 in South Korean television
Idol Star Athletics Championships